The 1993–94 Hartford Whalers season was the 22nd season of the franchise, 15th season in the NHL. The Whalers missed the playoffs for the second consecutive season. It was the first season that all four former WHA teams (Edmonton, Hartford, Quebec, Winnipeg) missed the playoffs since joining the NHL in 1979.

Off-season
On June 1, the Whalers acquired Brad McCrimmon from the Detroit Red Wings in exchange for a sixth-round draft pick in the 1993 NHL Entry Draft. McCrimmon scored 1 goal and 15 points in 60 games during the 1992–93 season. In his NHL career that began in 1979, McCrimmon had played in 1029 games, scoring 76 goals and 381 points. He was a member of the Calgary Flames during the 1988–89 season in which they won the Stanley Cup. During the 1985–86 season with the Philadelphia Flyers, McCrimmon scored 13 goals and 56 points in 80 games while having a plus-minus rating of +86. In 1987–88, his first season with the Flames, McCrimmon finished fourth in James Norris Memorial Trophy voting.

The Whalers acquired Sergei Makarov on June 20 in a trade with the Calgary Flames. Makarov scored 18 goals and 57 points in 71 games during the 1992–93 season. Makarov's stay with the Whalers would be short because six days later, he was traded to the San Jose Sharks (along with the Whalers' first-, second- and third-round draft picks in the 1993 NHL Entry Draft) in exchange for the Sharks' first-round draft pick, which was the second overall pick, in the 1993 NHL Entry Draft.

On June 24, the Whalers lost Terry Yake and Randy Ladouceur to the Mighty Ducks of Anaheim in the 1993 NHL Expansion Draft. Yake scored 22 goals and 53 points with the Whalers during the 1992–93 season, while Ladouceur scored 2 goals and 6 points in 62 games.

At the 1993 NHL Entry Draft held at Le Colisee in Quebec City on June 26, the Whalers held the second overall draft pick. With the pick, the Whalers selected Chris Pronger from the Peterborough Petes of the Ontario Hockey League. Pronger scored 15 goals and 77 points in 61 games, then scored 15 goals and 40 points in 21 playoff games for the Petes. Other players that the Whalers selected that played in the NHL include Marek Malik, Nolan Pratt, Manny Legace and Igor Chibirev.

At the 1993 NHL Supplemental Draft, the Whalers selected Kent Fearns from Colorado College. In 33 games during the 1992–93 season, Fearns scored 7 goals and 22 points for the Tigers.

On September 1, the Whalers announced that Brian Burke resigned from his position of general manager and president of the team as he joined the NHL front office as executive vice-president and director of hockey operations. Current head coach Paul Holmgren was promoted to take over the position.

On October 4, Hartford signed free agent Brian Propp. Propp appeared in 17 games with the Minnesota North Stars during the 1992–93 season, scoring three goals and six points. In 951 career games, Propp scored 413 goals and 975 points since beginning his career in the 1979–80 season with the Philadelphia Flyers. During his career, Propp had scored 40+ goals in a season four times, including a career-high 44 goals in the 1981–82 season.

Regular season
The Whalers were put into the new Northeast Division after the Adams Division was discontinued.

Final standings

Schedule and results

Playoffs
The Whalers did not qualify for the playoffs for the second consecutive season.

Player statistics

Regular season
Scoring

Goaltending

Note: GP = Games played; G = Goals; A = Assists; Pts = Points; +/- = Plus-minus PIM = Penalty minutes; PPG = Power-play goals; SHG = Short-handed goals; GWG = Game-winning goals;
      MIN = Minutes played; W = Wins; L = Losses; T = Ties; GA = Goals against; GAA = Goals-against average;  SO = Shutouts; SA=Shots against; SV=Shots saved; SV% = Save percentage;

Awards and records

Records

Milestones

Transactions
The Whalers were involved in the following transactions during the 1993–94 season.

Trades

Waivers

Free agents

Draft picks
Hartford's picks at the 1993 NHL Entry Draft

Farm teams

American Hockey League

ECHL

See also
1993–94 NHL season

References
 Whalers on Hockey Database

 

1993-94
1993–94 NHL season by team
1993–94 in American ice hockey by team
Hart
Hart